Pitcairnia sceptriformis is a vascular plant in the genus Pitcairnia. This species is native to Ecuador.

References

sceptriformis
Flora of Ecuador